Li Shucheng (1882–1965) was a senior leader of Kuomintang, and a politician of the People's Republic of China. 

In 1921, the first National Congress of the Chinese Communist Party was held in his house in Shanghai, thus the CCP was founded with his brother Li Hanjun. 

After the establishment of the People's Republic of China, Li served as the first Minister of Agriculture of PRC.

References

1882 births
1965 deaths
People of the Northern Expedition
People's Republic of China politicians from Hubei
Chinese Communist Party politicians from Hubei
Members of the Kuomintang
Politicians from Qianjiang
Republic of China politicians from Hubei
Burials at Babaoshan Revolutionary Cemetery